Herbie Matthews (20 November 1913 – 8 June 1990) was an Australian rules footballer who played for South Melbourne in the Victorian Football League (VFL). He was recruited to South Melbourne from suburban club Fairfield. His father, "Butcher" Matthews, partnered the great Roy Cazaly in South Melbourne's ruck combination of the early 1920s. Although he was smaller and slighter in build than his ruckman father, he was a strong mark and showed a ferocious drive for possession of the football. He was recruited by South Melbourne at the age of 17 in the face of determined approaches from Collingwood and his local Victorian Football Association club, Northcote.

A centreman and wingman with great pace, stamina and skills, he was awarded the Brownlow Medal in 1940 and was runner-up on another two occasions. He won his club's best and fairest award five times and captained them from 1938 until 1945.

Matthews crossed to Victorian Football Association club Oakleigh in 1946 as playing coach, and served there for two seasons.

In 1997 Matthews was inducted into the Australian Football Hall of Fame and in 2003 was named on the wing in South Melbourne's official Team of the Century.

References 

 
 AFL Hall of Fame

External links

1913 births
1990 deaths
Australian Football Hall of Fame inductees
Bob Skilton Medal winners
Brownlow Medal winners
Oakleigh Football Club players
Oakleigh Football Club coaches
Sydney Swans coaches
Sydney Swans players
Sydney Swans Premiership players
Australian rules footballers from Victoria (Australia)
One-time VFL/AFL Premiership players